Argas brumpti is a species of soft tick found in eastern and southern Africa. They can live for eight years without food and have the longest lifespan among ticks. The females are 20 millimeters long. These ticks do not cause disease or carry pathogens, but their bites can create long lasting painful lesions.

References 

Argasidae
Arachnids of Africa